Chang Yu may refer to:

 Chang Yu (常玉; 1901–1966), commonly known as Sanyu (painter), Chinese-French painter
 Chang Yu (tennis) (born 1988), Chinese tennis player
 Zhang Yu (spelled Chang Yü in Wade–Giles), multiple people
 Yu Chang (張育成; born 1995), Taiwanese baseball player